This is a list of colleges and universities in Alaska. This list also includes other educational institutions providing higher education, meaning tertiary, quaternary, and, in some cases, post-secondary education.

Institutions

Four-year Institutions

Two-year institutions

Public
 Iḷisaġvik College, tribal community college in Utqiaġvik
 Kenai Peninsula College, community college with campuses in Soldotna, Homer, Seward
 Kodiak College, community college in Kodiak
 Matanuska–Susitna College, community college in Palmer
 Prince William Sound College, community college in Valdez

Private
 Alaska Career College, for-profit vocational school in Anchorage
 Charter College, for-profit associate's college in Anchorage

See also

 List of college athletic programs in Alaska
 Higher education in the United States
 List of American institutions of higher education
 List of recognized higher education accreditation organizations
 List of colleges and universities
 List of colleges and universities by country

Notes

External links
 Department of Education listing of accredited institutions in Alaska

Colleges And Universities
Colleges And Universities
Alaska